One Day in the Life of Television is  a documentary that was broadcast on ITV on 1 November 1989. Filmed by over fifty crews exactly one year earlier, it was a huge behind-the-scenes look at a wide range of activities involved in the production, reception and marketing of British television. The project was funded by th Markle Foundation and organised by Richard Paterson and Janet Willis at the British Film Institute and produced and directed for television by Peter Kosminsky.

The documentary opens with TV-am's industrial conflict, with picketers outside of the studio at Camden Lock. The documentary also looks at Breakfast Time, Lucky Ladders and EastEnders. Reactions to the latter's representation of a prison storyline  were garnered from inmates in HMP Dartmoor.

The documentary also showed the marketing of cable television, and the availability of pornography through satellite television during the early evening.

A book by Sean Day-Lewis was published to accompany the documentary. It contained the thoughts selected from more than 20,000 participants  throughout Britain, including more than 3000 industry professionals, who recorded their feelings and experiences of television viewing on 1 November 1988, the day that the documentary was filmed.

References

External links

One Day in the Life of Television at BFI Film & TV Database
Watch One day in the life of television at Extrageographic.

1980s English-language films
1989 in British television
1989 television specials
Films directed by Peter Kosminsky
ITV (TV network) original programming
Television series by ITV Studios